Nicktoons Racing is a Nickelodeon crossover racing video game. The game was first developed by Pipe Dream and released for the Game Boy Color, while versions for different platforms were released in subsequent years. Most versions were developed by Software Creations with the exception of the Game Boy Advance version, which was developed by Crawfish Interactive, and the arcade version, which was developed by Chicago Gaming. The GBC version received negative reviews and the PlayStation version received mixed to positive reviews while the GBA port received positive reviews.

Plot
Various Nickelodeon characters each receive a letter invitation to compete in a Grand Prix for the top prize, the Krusty Krab Big Bun Award. The host of the competition, also the individual who sent the invitations, is an unknown, unseen driver of a sleek, black car with a tinted dome window simply dubbed as the Mystery Rider, which the participating racers are challenged to beat, as well as each other. Upon arriving and being announced by the Race Announcer, the Mystery Rider and other Nicktoons speed off to begin their first race.

Once the player ultimately completes the game and wins the final Cup to obtain the Krusty Krab Big Bun Award, their playable Nicktoon receives a year supply of Krabby Patties as it is hitched to their go-kart. The Mystery Rider arrives in his cart and is revealed to be Plankton. It stated by the Announcer that Plankton created the entire series of races as a plan to obtain the Krabby Patty secret formula. The winning racer then rides off into the sunset with their Krabby Patties and the credits begin to play.

Gameplay
Nicktoons Racing focuses on engaging players in go-kart racing through various Nicktoons-themed circuit tracks in a variety of different modes, similar to the Mario Kart series. The game features a wide selection of playable characters from various 1990's Nicktoons. The game offers an Easy, Medium, and Hard difficulty for the gameplay (with the game allowing you to unlock subsequently harder modes by accomplishing the last difficulty fully in Cups). The game also has a multiplayer option and can be played with a second player via split-screen utilization (multiplayer is available to all versions of the game except the Game Boy Color).

Each track features power-up presents that allow the player to gain advantages against their fellow racers in the form of various weapons and obstructions, as well as small orbs that a racer can collect and utilize to get a short-term speed boost. Each track also contains a variety of alternate routes and shortcuts that allow the various racers to shorten their laps (the harder the difficulty selected by the player, the more likely the NPCs are to utilize the shortcuts).

Cups
The primary mode for the racing gameplay. This mode allows the player(s) to take control of one of the Nicktoon racers and compete in a series of 4 races in the form of a Cup. There are 3 Cups and the second and third have to be unlocked by beating the previous Cup series. This is the mode required to beat the game's main story, unlock all the tracks for other modes of play, unlock The Mystery Rider as a playable kart, and the bonus minigames.

Time Trial (Single Player only)
A mode that can be used by the player to test their speed ability on each unlocked track. After finishing your first lap, a ghost racer will appear and perform the lap as the player did it on previous lap.

Race for Fun (Single Player only)
A mode that allows the player(s) to race a single track without competing in a Cup. The player progressively earns random collectible rewards for a trophy shelf the more races they participate at in a row and win.

Versus (Multiplayer only)
A mode that is generally the same as Race for Fun, but for two players instead. This mode does not feature collectibles.

Relay
A mode that allows the player(s) to pick three characters and race them in a 3-lap relay where each character performs one lap before tagging in the next racer. If the player hits their next racer directly, they get an initial speed boost for their next lap.

Bonus Levels
Besides the main racing tracks, the game also has a single-player and multiplayer specific bonus minigame that you unlock as you play-through and beat all the cups in Medium and Hard Mode.  
For single-player (Medium Mode reward), the player unlocks the Hey Arnold!-themed level Big City Clean Up in which the player is given a time trial in order to find and collect 60 of the power-up presents seen in the main racing gameplay.  
For multiplayer (Hard Mode reward), the player unlocks the SpongeBob SquarePants-themed level Beach Soccer in which two players push a beach ball around a field attempting to score more goals than the other in a timed match.

Characters
The game has 13 playable characters* each with their own distinctive go-karts (order as they appear on character select menu):

 Tommy Pickles (Rugrats)
 Angelica Pickles (Rugrats)
 Arnold Shortman (Hey Arnold!)
 Helga Pataki (Hey Arnold!)
 Eliza Thornberry (The Wild Thornberrys)
 Darwin Thornberry (The Wild Thornberrys)
 Daggett and Norbert Beaver (The Angry Beavers)
 CatDog (CatDog)
 SpongeBob SquarePants (SpongeBob SquarePants)
 Patrick Star (SpongeBob SquarePants)
 Ickis (from Aaahh!!! Real Monsters)
 Stimpy Cat (The Ren & Stimpy Show)
 Sheldon J. Plankton - The Mystery Rider (SpongeBob SquarePants)

Ren Hoëk (from The Ren & Stimpy Show) and Oblina (from Aaahh!!! Real Monsters) appear in the game's opening cutscene, but are not playable racers. Squidward Tentacles (from SpongeBob SquarePants) and Rancid Rabbit (from CatDog) also appear in the background of select tracks during actual gameplay. Stump (from The Angry Beavers) appears as an in-game item. The Race Announcer (voiced by Chris Jojo) is a fully new character created specifically for the game.

*All characters retain their original voice actors via reused audio bits from their respective shows.  The Game Boy Color version of the game features a heavily reduced roster of characters.

Reception

While the PlayStation game was not reviewed on IGN, it got mixed to positive reviews elsewhere, while the Game Boy Color version seemed mixed or negative with a 3.0/10 from IGN. The Game Boy Advance edition received positive reviews with an 8.0/10 on IGN.

Sequels
After several years of re-releasing Nicktoons Racing for different consoles and platforms, with the last being the arcade version released in 2003, a sequel was put into production. Nicktoons Winners Cup Racing was released for PC in February 2006. In 2008, a third Nicktoons Racing game was put into production, and was released in 2009 as Nicktoons Nitro, for exclusively for arcades. In July 2018, Nickelodeon Kart Racers was announced, and was released in October 2018 as the fourth game in the Nicktoons Racing series. On June 10, 2020, Nickelodeon Kart Racers 2: Grand Prix, a sequel to the 2018 game, was leaked by Target, was announced the next day, and was released in October 2020.

References

2000 video games
Arcade video games
Crossover racing games
Game Boy Advance games
Game Boy Color games
Kart racing video games
Nicktoon racing games
Nicktoons video games
PlayStation (console) games
Racing video games
Video games based on Hey Arnold!
The Ren & Stimpy Show video games
Aaahh!!! Real Monsters video games
The Wild Thornberrys video games
Rugrats and All Grown Up! video games
SpongeBob SquarePants video games
Windows games
Infogrames games
Hasbro games
Video games developed in the United Kingdom
Video games developed in the United States
Crawfish Interactive games
Multiplayer and single-player video games